Culture is the second studio album by American hip hop trio Migos. It was released on January 27, 2017, through Quality Control Music and YRN Tha Label, and distributed by 300 Entertainment. The album features guest appearances from DJ Khaled, Lil Uzi Vert, Gucci Mane, 2 Chainz and Travis Scott, while the production was handled by Metro Boomin, Zaytoven, Murda Beatz, Buddah Bless, and OG Parker, among others.

Culture was supported by three singles: "Bad and Boujee", "T-Shirt" and "Slippery". The album received generally positive reviews from critics and debuted at number one on the US Billboard 200. It also topped the US Top R&B/Hip-Hop Albums chart, becoming Migos' first number-one album on both charts. The album also debuted at number one on the Canadian Albums Chart. In July 2017, the album was certified platinum by the Recording Industry Association of America (RIAA). It was nominated for Best Rap Album at the 2018 Grammy Awards.

Background
The trio first initially announced that the title for their second album would be called No Label 3, however, they later changed it to Culture. After it was scheduled for release in October 2016, the release of the album was delayed due to their conflict with 300 Entertainment.

Cover art
The cover artwork is made by Stole "Moab" Stojmenov, a young Italian graphic designer based in Milan, and makes explicit reference on the turning point that this album represent for Migos themselves. The cover is what Migos gave to American hip hop culture and the city of Atlanta in every sphere, from music to fashion.

Promotion

Singles
On October 28, 2016, Migos released the lead single, "Bad and Boujee". The song features a guest appearance from American rapper Lil Uzi Vert, while the production was handled by Metro Boomin and G Koop. The song has topped the US Billboard Hot 100, marking the first ever number-one for Migos and Lil Uzi Vert, respectively. On June 20, 2017, "Bad and Boujee" was certified four-times platinum by the Recording Industry Association of America (RIAA).

"T-Shirt" was first released as the album's promotional single on January 6, 2017. It was later impacted urban contemporary radio as the album's second single on February 14, 2017. The song was produced by Nard & B and XL Eagle. It peaked at number 19 on the Billboard Hot 100.

"Slippery" featuring Gucci Mane, was released as the album's third single on May 16, 2017. The song was produced by Deko and OG Parker. It peaked at number 29 on the Billboard Hot 100.

Promotional singles
The first promotional single, "Call Casting", was released on January 13, 2017. The song was produced by Buddah Bless. It peaked at number 62 on the Billboard Hot 100.

The second promotional single, "What the Price", was released on January 19, 2017. The song was produced by Ricky Racks, Keanu Beats and 808Godz.

Critical reception

Culture was met with generally positive reviews. At Metacritic, which assigns a normalized rating out of 100 to reviews from professional publications, the album received an average score of 79, based on 18 reviews. Aggregator AnyDecentMusic? gave it 7.1 out of 10, based on their assessment of the critical consensus.

Neil Z. Yeung of AllMusic praised the album saying, "Culture propels the Migos three into the mainstream with a collection of woozy trap gems that is a peak in their young careers thus far". Writing for Rolling Stone, Christopher R. Weingarten said, "Culture also sees Migos upping their game musically, working with some of Atlanta's hottest producers (Metro Boomin, Zaytoven) to cook up stickier melodies than ever". Clayton Purdom of The A.V. Club said, "On Culture the band stakes a claim as the most important rap group to come out of Atlanta since Outkast. That it even seems fathomable is proof of the album's success". Steve "Flash" Juon of RapReviews said, "Offset has developed into a charismatic storyteller who holds your attention when he keep the stories on wax rather than behind bars". Karas Lamb of Consequence said, "Backed by production from Murda Beatz, Purps, Cardo, Zaytoven and Nard & B, co-pilots Quavo, Offset, and Takeoff sustain the hubris, excess, and immediate gratification adored by fans of gutter rap machismo while somehow bottling the very particular charm necessary for them to capture the hearts of pop-loving teens across the globe and carry rapping children's lit live on the radio". Chris Gibbons of XXL said, "Culture is a tour de force of all that makes Migos great while showcasing all of the group's strengths—the gift for catchy hooks and melodies, unique flows, incredible group chemistry and phenomenal one-liners".

Lewis Lister of Clash said, "CULTURE may be limited in its scope, but it delivers in spades everything one might have hoped for from "the Beatles of this generation". Sofia Rajkumarsingh of The Line of Best Fit said, "Migos never try to recreate anything they've already done, but simply deliver more music that reflects their contagious, unadulterated flow. Culture is an album where they seize a moment of much-deserved success". Winston Cook-Wilson of Spin said, "If you gauge artistic success by innovation, you can just filter the best of Culture, a very decent group of Migos songs, into a playlist. But if you appreciate Migos and the sound they ushered into contemporary rap as being one of the genre's most basic, essential natural resources, it will be easier to let the whole album—a drama of perseverance—ride out". Kitty Empire of The Observer said, "Like their increasingly musical, but still weird, productions, Migos's triplet-heavy, robotic non-flows have come on leaps and bounds, while retaining the group's core starkness".

Rankings

Industry awards

Commercial performance
Culture debuted at number one on the US Billboard 200, earning 131,000 album-equivalent units in its first week (44,000 of which were pure album sales). It also topped the US Top R&B/Hip-Hop Albums chart, becoming Migos' first number-one album on both charts. As of July 5, 2017, the album has moved 1,002,000 album-equivalent units in the United States. On July 14, 2017, Culture was certified platinum by the Recording Industry Association of America (RIAA) for combined sales, streaming and track-sales equivalent of a million units.

It also debuted at number one on the Canadian Albums Chart with first-week sales of 2,000 copies.

Track listing

Notes
  signifies an additional producer

Personnel
Credits adapted from the album's liner notes.

Performers
 Migos – primary artist
 DJ Khaled – featured artist (track 1)
 Lil Uzi Vert – featured artist (track 4)
 Gucci Mane – featured artist (track 6)
 2 Chainz – featured artist (track 10)
 Travis Scott – featured artist (track 12)

Technical
 Colin Leonard – mastering engineer
 Larry Anthony – mastering engineer
 Daryl McPherson – mixing engineer
 Michael Dottin – mixing engineer
 Quavious Marshall – mixing engineer

Production
 DY – producer (track 1)
 Tre Pounds – producer (track 1)
 Nard & B – producer (track 2)
 XL Eagle – producer (track 2)
 Buddah Bless – producer (track 3)
 Bron Bron – producer (track 3)
 Metro Boomin – producer (track 4)
 G Koop – producer (track 4)
 Murda Beatz – producer (track 5)
 Zaytoven – additional producer (track 5), producer (tracks 7, 9)
 Deko – producer (track 6)
 OG Parker – producer (track 6)
 Ricky Racks – producer (track 8)
 Keanu Beats – producer (track 8)
 808Godz – producer (track 8)
 Cardo – producer (track 10)
 Purps – producer (tracks 11, 13)
 Cash Clay Beats – producer (track 12)
 Deraj Global – producer (track 12)
 Cassius Jay – producer (track 13)

Additional personnel
 Stole Stojmenov – art direction and design
 Nick Steinhardt – package design
 Alex McDonell – photography

Charts

Weekly charts

Year-end charts

Decade-end charts

Certifications

Release history

References

2017 albums
Migos albums
Albums produced by Metro Boomin
Albums produced by Murda Beatz
Albums produced by Cardo
Albums produced by Zaytoven
Albums produced by Nard & B
Quality Control Music albums
Albums produced by OG Parker